Reginald Tucker (born 22 October 1967 in Bermuda) is a Bermudian cricketer. He is a right-handed batsman. He has played one first-class match to date for Bermuda, against Canada in the 2004 Intercontinental Cup.

References

External links
Cricket Archive profile
Cricinfo profile

1967 births
Living people
Bermudian cricketers